ABC Insight is a magazine which serves people connected with the Association of Baptist Churches in Ireland.

In December 2009 the magazine was relaunched with a new design and logo, with the tagline "Connecting Baptists". The following articles are expected in the future:
The Gospel and...
The Beatitudes
The church – biblical and in the 21st century
Overview of the Psalms
Being Human
The Family and Human Sexuality

References

External links
 Association of Baptist Churches in Ireland

Association of Baptist Churches in Ireland
Monthly magazines published in the United Kingdom
Religious magazines published in the United Kingdom
Christian magazines
Magazines published in Ireland
Magazines with year of establishment missing